In enzymology, an aldose 1-dehydrogenase is an enzyme that catalyzes the chemical reaction

D-aldose + NAD+  D-aldonolactone + NADH + H+

Thus, the two substrates of this enzyme are D-aldose and NAD+, whereas its 3 products are D-aldonolactone, NADH, and H+.

This enzyme belongs to the family of oxidoreductases, specifically those acting on the CH-OH group of donor with NAD+ or NADP+ as acceptor.  The systematic name of this enzyme class is D-aldose:NAD+ 1-oxidoreductase. Other names in common use include aldose dehydrogenase, and dehydrogenase, D-aldohexose.

References 

 
 
 

EC 1.1.1
NADH-dependent enzymes
Enzymes of unknown structure